David Boyle (born 31 August 1959) is an Australian former professional rugby league footballer who played in the 1980s and 1990s. He played for the South Sydney Rabbitohs in the New South Wales Rugby League (NSWRL) competition. Boyle played in the forwards, starting in the second row and moving to the front row midway through his career, though he was lightweight even by the standards of the 1980s. His high workrate, however, made him part of one of the strongest defences in the NSWRL competition of the late 1980s under George Piggins.

Boyle was a candidate for the 1986 Kangaroo tour and stands as one of the best forwards of his day who never played for Australia.

Boyle was selected to represent New South Wales as a forward for the three games of the 1987 State of Origin series as well as the fourth or 'exhibition' game of the year which was played at Veteran's Memorial Stadium in Long Beach, California. Boyle scored one State of Origin try in game III.

A one-club player, Boyle spent ten seasons with the Rabbitohs.

Boyle later moved into sports fitness and worked with St. George Illawarra Dragons and then the Rabbitohs as a strength and conditioning coach. David Boyle is a current board member of the Australian Strength & Conditioning Association.

In 2010, David Boyle was the endorsed Australian Labor Party candidate for the NSW federal Division of Gilmore. On 18 June 2010, Boyle announced that he would withdraw as the endorsed candidate for Gilmore. Later that year he was elected as a councillor for Shellharbour Council.

In 2011, David Boyle partnered with Pro Training Programs to offer his rugby league training programs for non professional athletes.

References

1959 births
Australian rugby league players
South Sydney Rabbitohs players
Country New South Wales Origin rugby league team players
New South Wales Rugby League State of Origin players
Living people
Rugby league props
Rugby league second-rows
South Sydney Rabbitohs captains